Jens Olov Heinrich Orback (born 21 April 1959 in Stockholm) is a Swedish Social Democratic politician. He was Minister for Democracy, Metropolitan Affairs, Integration, and Gender Equality in the Ministry of Justice in the Cabinet of Göran Persson (2004-2006). 

Jens Orback graduated from Stockholm University in 1985 with a Bachelor of Science in Economics. He was active in the Swedish Social Democratic Youth League at a local level, and worked in the Ministry of Finance in the late 1980s, before embarking on a career as a television journalist with the public service channels of Sveriges Television. In 2002, he returned to local politics in Stockholm, serving as the chair of the council of Maria-Gamla Stan borough until he became a minister on 1 November 2004.

Between 2008 and 2016 he was the Secretary General of the Olof Palme International Center, after which his currently works as Executive Director of the Global Challenges Foundation

References

External links
Information page on the Swedish Government web site
Orback becomes the Executive Director of the Global Challenges Foundation

1959 births
Living people
Politicians from Stockholm
Stockholm University alumni
Swedish Social Democratic Party politicians
Swedish Ministers for Gender Equality